Daniel John Cook Jr. (August 12, 1926 – July 3, 2008) was a sports writer for the San Antonio Express-News for 51 years. He is most notable for making the phrase "the opera ain't over till the fat lady sings" into common use.  Described as a "sports icon", Cook started working at KENS in 1956 and continued to work at the television station until 2000. For most of these years, the TV station was owned by the San Antonio Express-News.

Career
After beginning his sports writing career at the Houston Post, Cook worked at the San Antonio Express-News from August 14, 1952, until he retired on August 3, 2003. In early 1956, he first made national headlines when, acting on a tip, he confronted a suspect in a Houston robbery and in the process wound up himself arrested and charged with armed robbery. (He would later be exonerated when the suspect confessed to the original crime.) Cook wrote his first sports column for the San Antonio Express-News on November 29, 1956. During his newspaper career, he became in charge of editing the sports column in 1960 and held this role until 1975. Outside of the Express-News, Cook continued his sports career on the radio and television.

The phrase
In 1976, Ralph Carpenter of Texas Tech invented "the opera ain't over until the fat lady sings". The phrase became common use after Cook and Dick Motta used it during the 1978 NBA playoffs.

Honors and awards
On March 1, 1996, Cook was inducted into the San Antonio Sports Hall of Fame for his work as a columnist and a broadcaster.

Personal life
Cook was born and raised in Houston, Texas. He graduated St. Thomas High School in Houston and attended the University of Houston for two years.  He was married and had three children.

Death
Cook died on the night of July 3, 2008, after a long illness.

Partial bibliography

References

1926 births
2008 deaths
American columnists
American sports announcers
Sportswriters from Texas
American television personalities
Male television personalities
Writers from San Antonio
University of Houston alumni
St. Thomas High School (Houston, Texas) alumni